Tanya Tagaq  (Inuktitut syllabics: ᑕᓐᔭ ᑕᒐᖅ, born Tanya Tagaq Gillis, May 5, 1975), also credited as Tagaq, is a Canadian Inuk throat singer, songwriter, novelist, and visual artist from Cambridge Bay (Iqaluktuuttiaq), Nunavut, Canada, on the south coast of Victoria Island.

Early years
At the age of 15, after attending school in Cambridge Bay, Tagaq went to Yellowknife, Northwest Territories, to attend Sir John Franklin High School where she first began to practice throat singing. During this time Tagaq, like most other students from the central Arctic lived at Akaitcho Hall, the residential facility for Sir John Franklin High School. She later studied visual arts at the Nova Scotia College of Art and Design and while there developed her own solo form of Inuit throat singing, which is normally done by two women. Her decision to go solo was a pragmatic one: she did not have a singing partner.

Career 
Tagaq was a popular performer at Canadian folk festivals, such as Folk on the Rocks in 2005, and first became widely known both in Canada and internationally for her collaborations with Björk, including concert tours and the 2004 album Medúlla. She has also performed with the Kronos Quartet and Shooglenifty and has been featured on the Aboriginal Peoples Television Network.

In 2005, her CD entitled Sinaa (Inuktitut for "edge") was nominated for five awards at the Canadian Aboriginal Music Awards. At the ceremony on 25 October 2005, the CD won awards for Best Producer/Engineer, Best Album Design and Tagaq herself won the Best Female Artist award. Sinaa was nominated for the 2006 Juno Awards as the Best Aboriginal Recording.

Although primarily known for her throat singing, Tagaq is also an accomplished artist and her work was featured on the 2003 Northwestel telephone directory.

Her 2008 album Auk/Blood (ᐊᐅᒃ Inuktitut syllabics) features collaborations with Mike Patton, among others. In 2011, she released a live album titled Anuraaqtuq. It was recorded during Tagaq's performance at the Festival International de Musique Actuelle in Victoriaville.

In 2012 Tagaq performed the theme music for the CBC television show Arctic Air.

Tagaq released her third album, Animism, on May 27, 2014, on Six Shooter Records. The album was a shortlisted nominee for the 2014 Polaris Music Prize, her first nomination for that award, and won the $30,000 award on September 22, 2014. The album also won the Juno Award for Aboriginal Recording of the Year at the Juno Awards of 2015, and was nominated for Alternative Album of the Year.

Her fourth album Retribution was released in October 2016. Her show in Toronto in November was sold out.

In May 2018, Tagaq announced her first book, a blend of fiction and memoir titled Split Tooth, which was published in September 2018 by Penguin Random House. The book was named as a longlisted nominee for the 2018 Scotiabank Giller Prize and was shortlisted for the 2019 Amazon.ca First Novel Award.

Her fifth album Tongues, released in 2022, was inspired by Split Tooth and was recorded mostly before the COVID-19 pandemic with New York poet Saul Williams as producer, but the album was placed on hold for over a year. At that time, mixer Gonjasufi reworked the into a "grimier" sound.

Collaborations 
In 2005, Tagaq collaborated with Okna Tsahan Zam, a Kalmyk Khoomei throat singer, and Wimme, a Sami yoiker from Finland, to release the recording Shaman Voices.

She began collaborating with the Kronos Quartet in 2005. Since then, they have performed together at venues across North America, from the January 2006 debut of the project Nunavut at the Chan Centre for the Performing Arts in Vancouver, British Columbia, through to the New York's Spring for Music Festival at Carnegie Hall presentation of composer Derek Charke's 13 Inuit Throat Song Games (2014). In 2015, Tagaq was commissioned to write a piece for the Kronos Quartet's Fifty for the Future project.

Tagaq collaborated with composer Christos Hatzis, author Joseph Boyden and the Winnipeg Symphony Orchestra on the score for the Royal Winnipeg Ballet's Going Home Star: Truth and Reconciliation (2015), which won a 2017 Juno Award for Classical Album of the Year – Large Ensemble.   

In 2017, Tagaq and fellow Polaris laureate Buffy Sainte-Marie collaborated on the single "You Got to Run (Spirit of the Wind)", which appeared on Sainte-Marie's album Medicine Songs. The song was inspired by George Attla, a champion dog sled racer from Alaska. Tagaq has also appeared as a guest vocalist on songs by July Talk ("Beck + Call") and Weaves ("Scream").

In 2022, Tagaq and Chelsea McMullan collaborated on the documentary film Ever Deadly.

Activism 

Tagaq is a vocal supporter of traditional Inuit sealing and Indigenous land rights. 

In March 2014, Ellen DeGeneres donated $1.5 million to the Humane Society of the United States, an outspoken critic of the Canadian seal hunt. As a counter-response, people began posting "sealfies" — pictures of themselves wearing sealskin or eating seal meat. 

As part of this viral media campaign, Tagaq posted a picture of her young daughter lying beside a dead seal on Twitter. The seal had been killed to feed a group of local elders and is an essential part of an Inuk diet, eaten by necessity and tradition. The image caused backlash by animal rights activists, who directed online abuse and threats towards Tagaq. 

During her Polaris Music Prize acceptance speech, she encouraged people to wear and eat seal, and shouted, "Fuck PETA", which enraged animal rights activists. Inuit have been arguing since the 1980s that any attack on the seal hunt is an attack on the Indigenous hunt, because it destroys the market for furs. Subsequently, Tagaq tweeted, "I had a scrolling screen of 1200 missing and murdered indigenous women at the Polaris gala but people are losing their minds over seals." In 2016, Tagaq reported that she had been banned from Facebook for posting a photo of a sealskin coat.

The Aboriginal Peoples Television Network named Taqaq one of the 16 Indigenous "movers and shakers to watch in 2016." The list praised Taqaq's activism against "to expose hard truths about systemic racism in governments, missing and murdered Indigenous women and proudly supporting the practices and preservation of her culture such as seal hunting."

In 2020 she provided narration in the music video for "End of the Road", a protest song about the issue of missing and murdered Indigenous women by the rock band Crown Lands.

Awards and recognition
 2006 Juno Awards, nominee: Aboriginal Recording of the Year, Sinaa
 2009 Juno Awards, nominee: Aboriginal Recording of the Year and Instrumental Album of the Year, Auk/Blood
 2014 Polaris Music Prize, winner: Animism
 2014 Canadian Folk Music Pushing the Boundaries Award
 2015 Juno Awards, nominee: Alternative Album of the Year, Animism
 2015 Juno Awards, winner: Aboriginal Recording of the Year, Animism
 2015 Western Canadian Music Award, winner: Aboriginal Recording of the Year, Spiritual Recording of the Year and World Recording of the Year.
December 2016, Member of the Order of Canada recipient.
 2017 Juno Awards, winner: Classical Album of the Year - Large Ensemble, Going Home Star
2019 Indigenous Voices Award for prose published in English, "Split Tooth"

Discography

Collaborations 
 Going Home Star (2015)

See also
Indigenous Canadian personalities
 Sounds from the Ground

References

External links
 
 
 Tanya Tagaq at Six Shooter Records

1975 births
Living people
21st-century Canadian women writers
21st-century Canadian novelists
21st-century Canadian women singers
Canadian women folk singers
Canadian Folk Music Award winners
Canadian folk singers
Canadian Inuit women
Canadian women novelists
Inuit from the Northwest Territories
Inuit from Nunavut
Inuit musicians
Inuit throat singing
Inuit writers
Juno Award for Indigenous Music Album of the Year winners
Members of the Order of Canada
Musicians from Nunavut
NSCAD University alumni
People from Cambridge Bay
Polaris Music Prize winners
Six Shooter Records artists
Writers from Nunavut